The qualification for the 2016 Women's Olympic Handball Tournament was held from December 2014 to March 2016. Twelve teams qualified, the hosts, the World champion, four continental champions and six teams from the World Olympic qualification tournaments respectively.

Qualification summary

Legend for qualification type

Host country

World Championship

Continental qualification

Europe (1st ranking continent)

America (2nd ranking continent)

Asia (3rd ranking continent)
The competition was held in Nagoya, Japan.

All times are local (UTC+9).

Africa (4th ranking continent)
The competition was held in Luanda, Angola.

All times are local (UTC+1).

Olympic Qualification Tournaments
The Olympic Qualification Tournaments were held on 18–20 March 2016. Only twelve teams that have not yet qualified through the five events mentioned above could play in the tournament:

The top six teams from the World championship that did not already qualify through their continental championships are eligible to participate in the tournament.
The best ranked teams of each continent in the World championship represented the continent in order to determine the continental ranking. The first ranked continent received two more places for the tournament. The second, third and fourth ranked continent received one place each. The last place belongs to a team from Oceania, if it was ranked between 8th–12th at the World Championship. But, as no team from Oceania met this condition, the second ranked continent received an extra place instead. The teams, which already earned their places through their World championship ranking were not considered for receiving places through the continental criterion.
The twelve teams were allocated in three pools of four teams according to the table below. The top two teams from each pool qualified for the 2016 Olympic Games.

2016 Olympic Qualification Tournament #1

All times are local (UTC+1).

2016 Olympic Qualification Tournament #2

All times are local (UTC+1).

2016 Olympic Qualification Tournament #3

All times are local (UTC+3).

References

External links
Qualification System

Women's qualification
Handball Women
Olymp
Olymp
Olympics
Women's events at the 2016 Summer Olympics